The 2014 IIHF Challenge Cup of Asia was the 7th IIHF Challenge Cup of Asia, an annual international ice hockey tournament held by the International Ice Hockey Federation (IIHF). It took place between 16 and 22 March 2014 in Abu Dhabi, United Arab Emirates.

Top Division

Preliminary round

All times local. (UTC+04:00)

Division I

The Division I competition will played between 24 February and 2 March 2014 in Bishkek, Kyrgyzstan.

Standings

References

External links
International Ice Hockey Federation

Chal
I
2014
IIHF Challenge Cup of Asia
2014